Khomreh (literally "jar") is an Iranian film directed by Ebrahim Foruzesh. The story is set on a hot schoolyard where kids quench their thirst using water from a large jar. One day it starts to leak. Fixing it proves to be a bigger problem than expected.

Reception
It won the Golden Leopard at the 1994 Locarno International Film Festival.

References

External links

Golden Leopard winners
Iranian drama films